Dmytro Lypovtsev (born 10 October 1986) is a Ukrainian basketball player for BC Zaporizhya and the Ukrainian national 3x3 team. With national team, he won two bronze medals at the 2012 FIBA 3x3 World Championships in Athens, Greece, and bronze at the 2017 FIBA 3x3 Europe Cup in Amsterdam, Netherlands.

References

External links
 
 

1986 births
Living people
Basketball players at the 2019 European Games
BC Cherkaski Mavpy players
BC Hoverla players
BC Kharkivski Sokoly players
European Games competitors for Ukraine
Forwards (basketball)
Ukrainian men's basketball players
Ukrainian men's 3x3 basketball players
BC Zaporizhya players